Pound High School was a public high school located in Pound, Virginia. In 2011, Pound High School was closed and consolidated with J. J. Kelly High School to form Central High School in Wise, Virginia.

Notable alumni
Glen Roberts - Inducted to the Virginia Sports Hall of Fame.

References

Public high schools in Virginia
Schools in Wise County, Virginia
Educational institutions established in 1953
Educational institutions disestablished in 2011
1953 establishments in Virginia
2011 disestablishments in Virginia